Eddy Sulistianto (born 16 November 1961) is an Indonesian sailor. He competed in the Finn event at the 1988 Summer Olympics.

References

1961 births
Living people
Indonesian male sailors (sport)
Olympic sailors of Indonesia
Sailors at the 1988 Summer Olympics – Finn
Place of birth missing (living people)
20th-century Indonesian people